On June 22, 2013, a man went on a killing spree in Shanghai, China. Six people died and four others were injured. The perpetrator allegedly beat to death a coworker at Guangyu fine chemical company in Shanghai's Baoshan District, and then shot to death one person in Pudong District. The perpetrator shot and killed one person in the Baoshan District, and then returned to the fine chemical company, where he shot to death three more people before being apprehended. The suspected perpetrator is 62-year-old Jieming Fan.

Details
The attacker allegedly beat a colleague to death at the Guangyu fine chemical company in the Baoshan district of the city. He retrieved a hunting rifle that had been hidden in his dormitory, and then asked a taxi cab driver to take him to Pudong District. When the cab stopped in the Pudong District, the attacker shot the driver to death and drove the vehicle back to Baoshan. In Baoshan, he shot and killed a soldier who was guarding the entrance to a barracks and stole his gun. The suspect then returned to the factory and shot dead three more people, including a manager who may have also been one of the factory's owners.

Suspect
The suspected perpetrator is 62-year-old Fan Jieming. According to Shanghai police, the rampage may have been motivated by an economic dispute.

References

Crime in Shanghai
Deaths by firearm in China
Mass murder in 2013
Mass shootings in China
Spree shootings in China
21st century in Shanghai
June 2013 events in China
China
21st-century mass murder in China